Miraclathurella bicanalifera is a species of sea snail, a marine gastropod mollusk in the family Pseudomelatomidae, the turrids and allies.

Description
The length of the shell varies between 15 mm and 18 mm.

The whorls are narrowly shouldered. The longitudinal ribs are granose, crossed by raised striae. The color of the shell is dark chocolate-brown.

Distribution
This marine species occurs in the Pacific Ocean off Panama; also off Costa Rica and Mexico.

References

 Sowerby, G. B. "The Genera of Recent and Fossil Shells, vol. II." London, pls (1834): 127–262.

External links
 
 Gastropods.com: Miraclathurella bicanalifera

bicanalifera
Gastropods described in 1834